Saint-Folquin is a commune in the Pas-de-Calais department in the Hauts-de-France region of France named for a 9th-century Christian saint named Folquin.

Geography
Saint-Folquin is located some 8 miles (13 km) east of Calais on the D229 road, just yards from junction 51 of the A16 autoroute.

Population

Places of interest
 The church of St. Folquin, dating from the sixteenth century
 The motte of a 14th-century castle

See also
Communes of the Pas-de-Calais department

References

Saintfolquin